{{Infobox video game series|title=Drawn to Life|image=Drawn to Life series logo.png|caption=Logo of latest title in the series|genre=Action-adventureplatformpuzzle|developer=5th Cell (2007–09)Planet Moon Studios (2009) Digital Continue
(2020){{collapsible list|title=OtherWayForward Technologies}}|publisher=THQ (2007-2009)505 Games (2020)|platforms=Nintendo Switch, Wii, Nintendo DS, Microsoft Windows, iOS, Android|first release version=Drawn to Life|first release date=10 September 2007|latest release version=Drawn to Life: Two Realms|latest release date=7 December 2020}}Drawn to Life''' is an action-adventure puzzle platform video game series originally developed by 5th Cell and published THQ, since 2013 all entries in the series have been published by 505 Games.

 Games 

 Drawn to Life (2007) 

 Drawn to Life: The Next Chapter 
The Nintendo Wii version of the game, developed by Planet Moon Studios, was announced by THQ's CEO and President Brian Farrell on February 5, 2008, at a conference meeting at the company. With the Nintendo DS version of Drawn to Life: The Next Chapter being announced at E3 2009, The game was released in October 2009, Drawn to Life: The Next Chapter for both the Wii and Nintendo DS introduces new gameplay mechanics such as the hero's ability to transform into different objects.

 Drawn to Life: Two Realms (2020) 
Following THQ's bankruptcy in 2013, the rights to the Drawn to Life franchise as a whole would be acquired by 505 Games. Several years after 505 acquired the franchise, a new instalment within the series, entitled Drawn to Life: Two Realms'', was rated by the Taiwan Digital Game Rating Committee on October 22, 2020. The game was then announced the following month and was confirmed to be developed by Digital Continue, and published by 505 Games and was set to release on December 7, 2020, for the Nintendo Switch, iOS, Android, and Microsoft Windows.

References

External links 
 Official website

5th Cell games
505 Games games
Action-adventure games
IOS games
Nintendo DS games
Platform games
THQ games
Multiplayer and single-player video games
Drawing video games
Video games developed in the United States